The Women's high jump competition at the 1968 Summer Olympics in Mexico City was held on 16–17 October.

Results

Qualifying

Final

References

Athletics at the 1968 Summer Olympics
High jump at the Olympics
1968 in women's athletics
Women's events at the 1968 Summer Olympics